Boma is a village in the Ponda taluka (sub-district) of Goa. It is located in the northern part of Ponda taluka. It is on the road connecting state capital Panjim (or Panaji) with the taluka headquarters of Ponda town.

Location in Ponda taluka
It is situated along the highway, and lies close to Cundaim (or Kundaim), and before Mardol, known for its scenic and prominent temples. In its vicinity, to its east, lie Querim (or Keri), Savoi-Verem and Volvoi.

Area, population

According to the official 2011 Census, the village has an area of 394.60 hectares, a total of 653 households, and a population of 2,807 (comprising 1,467 males and 1,340 females) with an under-six population of 284 (comprising 149 boys and 135 girls).

Its location code number in the Census (2011) is 626848.

Local market
The prominent local Banastarim market is situated nearby. In 2011, the local village panchayat had announced plans of "raising a market complex with shops and basic amenities...and construct a market at the fort."

The market attracts buyers from the surrounding Ponda taluka (sub-district) and also from neighbouring Tiswadi taluka. It is known for its fruits, vegetables, food items, clothing and domestic products. Plans were announced for a two-storey structure with a community hall and shops, and slots for vendors. It was expected to be completed in about two years, vendors were quoted as saying.

Local jurisdiction
Boma comes under the Bhoma Adcolna village panchayat or local council body.

Political constituencies
Boma comes under the Priol assembly constituency of the Goa Legislative Assembly and the North Goa parliamentary constituency for Parliament. Its nearest town is Ponda.

References

Villages in North Goa district